Slovak rail border crossings, as of 2007. Crossings in italic are abandoned. Year of opening in brackets.

Slovakia – Czech Republic 
Note that all those railway lines were built before dissolution of Czechoslovakia in 1993 and became border in that year
 Kúty – Lanžhot (1900)
 Holíč nad Moravou – Hodonín (1891), currently no regular passenger traffic
 Skalica na Slovensku – Sudoměřice –  (1893), currently no regular passenger traffic
 Vrbovce – Velká nad Veličkou (1929)
 Horné Srnie – Vlárský průsmyk (1888)
 Lúky pod Makytou – Horní Lideč (1937)
 Čadca – Mosty u Jablunkova (1871)

Slovakia – Poland 
 Skalité – Zwardoń (1884)
 Suchá Hora – Podczerwone (1899–1975)
 Plaveč – Muszyna (1876),  no passenger trains, only RegionalExpress trains from Poprad
 Medzilaborce – Łupków (1874), see also Łupków Pass

Slovakia – Ukraine 
 Maťovce – Uzhhorod, freight transport only, see Uzhhorod - Košice broad gauge track (1966)
 Čierna nad Tisou – Chop (1872)

Slovakia – Hungary 
 Rusovce – Rajka (1891)
 Komárno – Komárom (1910) (Freight Trains only, no passenger traffic since 14 December 2008)
 Chľaba – Szob (1850)
 Pastovce – Nagybörzsöny (1885–1918, Narrow gauge)
 Šahy – Hont (1886–1945) (track dismantled)
 Kalonda – Ipolytarnóc (Freight Trains only, no passenger traffic since 2 February 2003)
 Nógrádszakál – Bušince (Freight Trains only, no passenger traffic since 2 August 1992)
 Fiľakovo – Somoskőújfalu (1871), freight trains only, no passenger traffic since 1 May 2011
 Lenartovce – Bánréve (1873), freight trains only, no passenger traffic since 12 December 2009
 Turňa nad Bodvou – Tornanádaska (1890) (track out of use, no traffic)
 Kechnec – Hidasnémeti (1860)
 Slovenské Nové Mesto – Sátoraljaújhely (1872), (Freight Trains only, no passenger traffic)
 Pribeník – Zemplénagárd (Canceled, Narrow gauge)

Slovakia – Austria 
 Bratislava-Petržalka – Kittsee (1897–1945, line re-opened in 1998)
 Bratislava-Petržalka – Berg  – Wolfsthal (1911–1945)
 Devínska Nová Ves – Marchegg (1848)

See also 
 Polish rail border crossings
 Czech rail border crossings
 Hungarian rail border crossings

External links 
 Border crossings: Slovakia on Enthusiast's Guide to Travelling the Railways of Europe
 Map of lines connecting Bratislava and Wien on rail.sk

Rail transport in Slovakia
Rail